Caldanaerobius is a moderately thermophilic and anaerobic genus of bacteria from the family of Thermoanaerobacteraceae with one known species (Caloribacterium cisternae).

References

 

Thermoanaerobacterales
Monotypic bacteria genera
Bacteria genera
Thermophiles
Anaerobes